Eli C. D. Shortridge (March 29, 1830 – February 4, 1908) was an American politician who was the third Governor of North Dakota from 1893 to 1895. Shortridge was the first governor to live in the executive mansion.

Biography
Born Eli Charles Daniel Shortridge, he was the eighth of nine children born to Levi and Elizabeth Love Shortridge. Shortridge was born in Cabell County (in modern-day West Virginia; the county was still a part of Virginia at the time of his birth), and grew up in Monroe County, Missouri. He completed his education at an academy located near Paris, Missouri. He moved to Larimore, North Dakota with his family, second wife Anna Burton and twin daughters, in 1882.

Career
Shortridge ran for governor ten years later in 1893 on a fusion ticket composed of Populists, Democrats, and the Farmers' Alliance, who merged into a single Democratic-Independent Party. The new party was very successful, but very short-lived; the party dissolved soon after Shortridge's retirement.

During his administration, Shortridge approved the issuance of $50,000 in bonds to construct the south wing of the state capitol and approved the purchase of an executive mansion for the governor's residence. He also supported an appropriation for a state elevator at Duluth, Minnesota. An out-of-state terminal elevator was not constructed largely due to a provision requiring North Dakota sovereignty over any elevator site. The bill passed, but the provision that Minnesota or Wisconsin would have to cede sovereignty over the site created an unacceptable situation for both states. Governor Shortridge retired from office after one term. He was appointed clerk of the General Land Office at Devils Lake, North Dakota.

After the death of Anna, Shortridge married a third time to Dorcas Virginia Brady and they had five children.

Death
Shortridge died on February 4, 1908, and is interred at Devil's Lake Cemetery, Devil's Lake, North Dakota.

References

External links
Biography for Eli C. D. Shortridge from the State Historical Society of North Dakota website.
 
 State Historical Society of North Dakota

Democratic Party governors of North Dakota
1830 births
1908 deaths
People from Cabell County, West Virginia
People from Monroe County, Missouri
People from Grand Forks County, North Dakota
19th-century American politicians